Oxapium iodide (ciclonium or cyclonium, trade name Oxaperan) is an antispasmodic indicated for the treatment of gastritis, gastroduodenal ulcer, enteritis, and other conditions. It is marketed in South Korea by Dongsung Pharmaceuticals.

External links
 Manufacturer's product page

Muscarinic antagonists
Quaternary ammonium compounds